The Interosseous cuneometatarsal ligaments are fibrous bands that connect the adjacent surfaces of the cuneiform and the metatarsal bones.

Foot
Ligaments